King Creek may refer to:

United States
 King Creek (Crow River tributary), a stream in Minnesota
 King Creek (New York), a stream
 King Creek, a stream in Tishomingo, Mississippi

Other places
 King Creek, Ontario, an unincorporated community in Canada
 King Creek, an area in Wauchope, New South Wales, Australia

See also 
 King River (disambiguation)
 Kings Creek (disambiguation)